Fabjan Kaliterna (20 January 1886 – 30 January 1952) was a Croatian architect and sportsperson. Born into a large family of a humble background, Kaliterna graduated from the real-gymnasium in his hometown in 1906, after which he enrolled at the Higher Technical School in Prague from which he graduated in 1921.

Considered the "father of sports in Split", Kaliterna was one of four founders of the HNK Hajduk Split football club, founder of the "Gusar" rowing club and helped in the formation of the Jadran waterpolo-swimming club and the Labud sailing club. Aside from his club-founding activities, Kaliterna also held numerous sports functions; he was the 16th president of Hajduk during 1936, member of the Yugoslav Olympic Committee and the Split Olympic Sub-Committee, president of the Split Football Sub Federation and member of the organizational committee of the 1932 European Rowing Championships.

On a professional level, Kaliterna was an accomplished architect having designed over two hundred buildings in Split and Dalmatia, among them, several sport-related buildings used to house Split-based sports clubs. Among his notable works is the building of the Oceanographic Institute in Split, constructed in 1920s and still in use today.

See also 
Luka Kaliterna
Bogumir Doležal

Notes

Footnotes

References 



Sportspeople from Split, Croatia
HNK Hajduk Split
19th-century Croatian architects
20th-century Croatian architects
1886 births
1952 deaths
Croatian sports executives and administrators
Burials at Lovrinac Cemetery